Cathy Young (born 1951) is a Canadian singer and songwriter. Her first album, A Spoonful of Cathy Young, was released in 1969. Her second album, Travel Stained, was released in 1973. Young won the Juno Award for Best New Artist in 1974, and was nominated for the Juno Award in the category of Best Female Vocalist in 1975. In November 2017, Young's image was included on a 70 ft. mural of Canadian music Icons who have performed at historic Yonge Street music venues. The 22-storey mural currently is the second tallest in the world, and was created by noted Toronto artist Adrian Hayles.

Early life and education
Young was born in Toronto, Ontario in 1951. She began singing at the age of three and became a busker as a teenager. When she was sixteen, she sang at The Mynah Bird in Yorkville, Toronto.

Career
After performing at a Queen's Park love-in, in May 1967 and performances at The Rock Pile, Young was signed by Shel Safran, manager of the Detroit band, The Amboy Dukes. Young released her debut album A Spoonful Of Cathy Young in April 1969 on Mainstream Records. Her first album was named 'Pick of the Week ' by Billboard magazine in May 1969. In 1973, Young released her second album  Travel Stained on GRT Records. Young has traveled the world, performing in USA, Mexico, Hong Kong, Cyprus, Thailand, Australia, Caribbean, Hawaii to name a few. Young has portrayed Mary Magdalene in Robert Stigwood's musical Jesus Christ Superstar and voice acted for multiple video games including part of The Black Mirror series. She also has voice directed the English version of the award winning video game " Drakensang, River of Time ". Young was also a founding member of the Spirit of Yorkville Alumni, and produced the Spirit of Yorkville Music Festival in Toronto.

Discography
A Spoonful of Cathy Young (1969)
Travel Stained (1973)
Young, Live & Rare  (2016)

Awards and honours
In 1974, Young won the Juno Award for Most Promising Female Vocalist of the Year. The following year, she was nominated for the Juno Award for Best Female Artist. In 2011, Young was featured in the documentary Yonge Street - Toronto Rock & Roll Stories.
Young was honoured in multiple tribute concerts held during the period of October 2012 to June 2013. In November 2017 Young's image was included in the 22 storey mural at 423 Yonge Street, depicting music icons who have performed in historic Yonge Street venues. The mural was created by noted Toronto artist Adrian Hayles.  Young's first recording on Mainstream Records USA, inducted to the Friar’s Music Museum in Toronto located at the world famous Yonge–Dundas Square.  Young was featured in the book, Music from Far and Wide: Celebrating 40 Years of the Juno Awards (Key Porter Books)
and Bill King’s book ‘ Talk ' Conversations in all Keys.

References
LIVE INTERVIEWS
https://www.spreaker.com/user/4414302/liner-notes-cathy-young-public 
interview with Dan Hare
https://www.youtube.com/watch?v=84Xvty135Jg&t=143s with Julia Cosby
https://www.youtube.com/watch?v=qWPnlbvlxd8  with Roxanne Tellier Part ONE
https://www.youtube.com/watch?v=lpOK_YtJKuk    Part TWO with Roxanne Tellier

1951 births
Canadian folk singer-songwriters
Juno Award for Breakthrough Artist of the Year winners
Living people
Musicians from Toronto
20th-century Canadian women singers
21st-century Canadian women singers